Saint Michael's Academy is an American day and boarding school for boys and girls from kindergarten through twelfth grade located in Spokane, Washington, United States, and administered by the Congregation of Mary Immaculate Queen, a Sedevacantist Traditionalist Catholic religious congregation.

History
St. Michael's Academy was founded in 1968 as Maria Regina Academy by Francis Schuckardt, a leader in the Blue Army of Our Lady of Fatima in northern Idaho as a group of four schools, a high school each for boys and girls and a grade school each for boys and girls.

In September 1978, the boys high school moved to Mount Saint Michael in Spokane, Washington.  In 1996 the individual schools within Maria Regina Academy, Holy Angels Elementary School, Immaculata High School for girls and St. Michael's High School for boys, were united into a single school and was renamed Saint Michael's Academy.

Athletics

In 1990, William Mashburn established the first boys’ basketball team, which was the first ever athletics offered at the High School. Competing primarily against Christian schools, St. Michael's worked in public schools as healthy competition. After winning multiple yearly tournaments, membership to the Panorama League was reached in 1994. With this new membership, St. Michaels established a solid baseball program. In 1996, Larry Urann developed the first girls’ softball team. 
As a result of League membership, a girls’ basketball team had to be in existence within five years. Due to the attitudes and beliefs of certain religious members, girls’ sports in general were frowned upon due to the idea that they were not “Mary-like” or “immodest” due to physical contact and the wearing of tank tops and shorts. But after much procrastination, in 1999 the first ever girls’ basketball team was formed.
Students at St. Michael's for years enjoyed a normal environment with academics and sports. That would change in the late 2000s. Due to the exodus of many Religious, the school was left without educated teachers and leaders.  This led to the mismanagement of the school and the sports program. As a result, St. Michael's leadership ran out perennial coaches and changed the membership of the Panorama League to the Bi-County league citing a less distance to travel for away games. Teachers were complaining that students were gone too long from the classroom and the much quieted resentment about the sports program gained significant momentum with the faculty.  As a result, the opportunity was ripe for what the faculty wanted - a complete withdrawal from organized league sports. The principal of the school, Sr. Vianney, issued a letter in 2013 citing off the spot's program. 
But in later year's the school saw the changes in the student's attitude towards School and the drop of student population. Due to these facts "St. Michael's decided to bring back most of these sport's including baseball, cross-country, basketball, and softball, in the upcoming 2019-2020 school year.

References

External links
Saint Michael's Academy

Private high schools in Washington (state)
High schools in Spokane County, Washington
Boarding schools in Washington (state)
Schools in Spokane, Washington
Private middle schools in Washington (state)
Private elementary schools in Washington (state)